Lindacatalina is a genus of crabs in the family Pseudothelphusidae, containing the following species:
 Lindacatalina brevipenis (Rodríguez & Diaz, 1980)
 Lindacatalina hauserae (Pretzmann, 1977)
 Lindacatalina latipenis (Pretzmann, 1968)
 Lindacatalina orientalis (Pretzmann, 1968)
 Lindacatalina puyensis (Pretzmann, 1978)
 Lindacatalina sinuensis Rodríguez, Campos & López, 2002
 Lindacatalina sumacensis Rodríguez & von Sternberg, 1998

References

Pseudothelphusidae